The Pony Express was a U.S. mail service that operated from April 1860 to October 1861.

Pony Express may also refer to:

Film and television
 The Pony Express (1907 film), an American silent short film
 The Pony Express (1925 film), an American silent film by James Cruze
 Pony Express (film), a 1953 American film
 Pony Express (TV series), a 1959–60 television series

Sports
 Denver Broncos Cheerleaders, known as the Pony Express from 1977 to 1985
 SMU Mustangs football team, nicknamed The Pony Express in the 1980s

Other uses
 Pony express (newspapers), a dispatch service employed by newspapers prior to adoption of the telegraph
 Pony Express (roller coaster), a roller coaster at Knott's Berry Farm amusement park
 Operation Pony Express, a military operation during the Vietnam War
 Pony Express Bridge, a bridge over the Missouri River on US-36	
 Pony Express Council, a scouting organization in Missouri
 Pony Express Historical Association, the not-for-profit organization that owns the historical Patee House (the headquarters of the Pony Express)
 Pony Express Museum, a transport museum in Saint Joseph, Missouri
 Pony Express Region, a region of northwestern Missouri
 Pony Express Stables, the eastern terminus of the Pony Express, now the home of the museum
 Pony Express Terminal, the western endpoint of the Pony Express

See also
 Pony Express Bible
 Pony Express Record, a 1994 album by Shudder to Think